Jack Cotter (8 January 1915 – 27 July 1976) was an Australian rules footballer who played in the VFL between 1935 and 1941 for the Richmond Football Club and in 1946 for the South Melbourne Football Club.

Serving in the Australian Army between 1942 and 1946, Cotter went on to become Captain/Coach of Golden Point, Golden Square, Dunkeld, Alexandra, Yarck and Dunolly, leading his teams to Premierships in 1947 (Golden Point), 1952 (Alexandra) and 1958 (Dunolly).

References

Hogan P: The Tigers Of Old, Richmond FC, Melbourne 1996

Richmond Football Club players
Sydney Swans players
Golden Point Football Club players
Golden Point Football Club coaches
Australian rules footballers from Victoria (Australia)
1915 births
1976 deaths
Australian Army personnel of World War II